General Sir George de Symons Barrow,  (25 October 1864 – 28 December 1959) was a British Indian Army officer who became General Officer Commanding Yeomanry Mounted Division and the 4th Cavalry Division.

Military career
Barrow was commissioned into the Connaught Rangers in 1884. Having transferred to the 35th Scinde Horse, British Indian Army in 1886, he served in Waziristan on the North West Frontier of India in 1895 and was promoted to captain on 23 August 1895. He became aide-de-camp (ADC) to General Sir William Lockhart, Commander-in-Chief in India, in September 1899, then served in China during the Boxer Rebellion the following year. In December 1901 he was appointed ADC to General Sir Arthur Palmer, who had succeeded as Commander-in-Chief in India, and the following March he also tok the position of Interpreter to the C-in-C. Promotion to major followed on 23 August 1902.

He was appointed Deputy Adjutant and Quartermaster General in India in 1903, Deputy Assistant Adjutant General at the Staff College, Camberley in 1908 and then became a staff officer at the Staff College, Quetta in 1911. He served in World War I as a staff officer on British Expeditionary Force in 1914 and as General Officer Commanding Yeomanry Mounted Division and the 4th Cavalry Division in 1917 and in 1918 being present at the fall of Jerusalem in Palestine in 1917. He served in the Third Anglo-Afghan War in 1919 and became General Officer Commanding the Peshawar District of India in 1919, Adjutant-General, India in 1923 and General Officer Commanding Eastern Command, India later that year before retiring in 1929. He served in the Home Guard during World War II.

Family
Barrow came from a Jewish family and was born on 25 October 1864 at Naini Tal in British India. He had three brothers, two of whom were also soldiers. His father, Lyon de Symons Barrow, was a major-general in the service of the Indian Army then Inspector-General of Police in the United Provinces, and himself had several brothers who were military officers. In 1902 he married Sybilla Way, daughter of Colonel G. Way; their son died in 1944 on active service.

References

Further reading
 The Fire of Life by George de Symons Barrow, published by Hutchinson, 1942
 Two cavalry episodes in the Palestine campaign of 1917–1918 by George de Symons Barrow, published by the Royal United Service Institution, 1936

|-

|-

1864 births
1959 deaths
Indian Army cavalry generals of World War I
Connaught Rangers officers
Knights Grand Cross of the Order of the Bath
Knights Commander of the Order of St Michael and St George
British military personnel of the Boxer Rebellion
British Home Guard officers
British military personnel of the Third Anglo-Afghan War
Jewish military personnel
British people of Jewish descent
British Indian Army generals
Military personnel of British India
Academics of the Staff College, Quetta
Academics of the Staff College, Camberley